Omega (capital: Ω, lowercase: ω; Ancient Greek ὦ, later ὦ μέγα, Modern Greek ωμέγα) is the twenty-fourth and final letter in the Greek alphabet. In the Greek numeric system/isopsephy (gematria), it has a value of 800. The word literally means "great O" (ō mega, mega meaning "great"), as opposed to omicron, which means "little O" (o mikron, micron meaning "little").

In phonetic terms, the Ancient Greek Ω represented a long open-mid back rounded vowel , comparable to the "aw" of the English word raw in dialects without the cot–caught merger, in contrast to omicron which represented the close-mid back rounded vowel  , and the digraph ου which represented the long close-mid back rounded vowel . The letter omega is transliterated into a Latin-script alphabet as ō or simply o.

As the final letter in the Greek alphabet, omega is often used to denote the last, the end, or the ultimate limit of a set, in contrast to alpha, the first letter of the Greek alphabet; see Alpha and Omega.

History
Ω was not part of the early (8th century BC) Greek alphabets. It was introduced in the late 7th century BC in the Ionian cities of Asia Minor to denote a long open-mid back rounded vowel . It is a variant of omicron (Ο), broken up at the side, with the edges subsequently turned outward.
The Dorian city of Knidos as well as a few Aegean islands, namely Paros, Thasos and Melos, chose the exact opposite innovation, using a broken-up circle for the short and a closed circle for the long .

The name Ωμέγα is Byzantine; in Classical Greek, the letter was called ō (pronounced /ɔ̂ː/), whereas the omicron was called ou (pronounced /ôː/). 
The modern lowercase shape goes back to the uncial form , a form that developed during the 3rd century BC in ancient handwriting on papyrus, from a flattened-out form of the letter that had its edges curved even further upward.

In addition to the Greek alphabet, Omega was also adopted into the early Cyrillic alphabet. See Cyrillic omega (Ѡ, ѡ). A Raetic variant is conjectured to be at the origin or parallel evolution of the Elder Futhark ᛟ.

Omega was also adopted into the Latin alphabet, as a letter of the 1982 revision to the African reference alphabet. It has had little use. See Latin omega.

The symbol Ω (uppercase letter) 

The uppercase letter Ω is used as a symbol:
 In chemistry:
 For oxygen-18, a natural, stable isotope of oxygen.
 For omega loop, a protein structural motif consisting of a loop of six or more amino acid residues in any sequence, a structure named for its resemblance to the Greek letter.
 In physics:
 For ohm – SI unit of electrical resistance; formerly also used upside down (℧) to represent mho, the old name for the inverse of an ohm (now siemens with symbol S) used for electrical conductance. Unicode has a separate code point for the ohm sign (U+2126, Ω), but it is included only for backward compatibility, and the Greek uppercase omega character (U+03A9, Ω) is preferred.
 In statistical mechanics, Ω refers to the multiplicity (number of microstates) in a system.
 The solid angle or the rate of precession in a gyroscope.
 In particle physics to represent the Omega baryons.
 In astronomy (cosmology), Ω refers to the density of the universe, also called the density parameter.
 In astronomy (orbital mechanics), Ω refers to the longitude of the ascending node of an orbit.
In mathematics and computer science:
 In complex analysis, the Omega constant, a solution of Lambert's W function
 In differential geometry, the space of differential forms on a manifold (of a certain degree, usually with a superscript).
 A variable for a 2-dimensional region in calculus, usually corresponding to the domain of a double integral.
 In topos theory, the (codomain of the) subobject classifier of an elementary topos.
 In combinatory logic, the looping combinator, (S I I (S I I))
 In group theory, the omega and agemo subgroups of a p-group, Ω(G) and ℧(G)
 In group theory, Cayley's Ω process as a partial differential operator.
 In statistics, it is used as the symbol for the sample space, or total set of possible outcomes.
 In number theory, Ω(n) is the number of prime divisors of n (counting multiplicity).
 In notation related to Big O notation to describe the asymptotic behavior of functions.
 Chaitin's constant.
In set theory, the first infinite ordinal number, ω
 In set theory, the first uncountable ordinal number, ω1 or Ω
As part of logo or trademark:
 The logo of Omega Watches SA.
 The logo of Omegaklinikken
 Part of the original Pioneer logo.
 Part of the Badge of the Supreme Court of the United Kingdom.
 Part of the mission patch for STS-135, as it was the last mission of the Space Shuttle program.
 The logo of the God of War video game series based on Greek mythology. In God of War (2018), it is revealed it stands as the symbol of war in Greece. 
 The logo of E-123 Omega, a Sonic the Hedgehog character.
 The logo of the Heroes of Olympus series, based on Greek mythology.
 the logo of the Ultramarines in Warhammer 40,000
 The logo of Primal Groudon, the version mascot of Pokémon Omega Ruby.
 The logo of Darkseid in DC comics
 One of the logos of professional wrestler Kenny Omega
 The logo for Meow Wolf's Omega Mart in Area15, Las Vegas, Nevada.
 The logo for AMPLY Power’s Omega™ Charge Management System.
 The logo of Lalaji Memorial Omega International School
Other:  
 The symbol of the resistance movement against the Vietnam-era draft in the United States
 Year or date of death
 In eschatology, the symbol for the end of everything
In molecular biology, the symbol is used as shorthand to signify a genetic construct introduced by a two-point crossover
 Omega Particle in the Star Trek universe
 The final form of NetNavi bosses in some of the Mega Man Battle Network games
 The personal symbol for Death, as worn by Death in the Discworld series by Terry Pratchett
 A secret boss in the Final Fantasy series called Omega ( Ω ) Weapon.
 A character from the series Doctor Who called Omega, believed to be one of the creators of the Time Lords of Gallifrey.
 The symbol for the highest power level of a PSI attack in the MOTHER/EarthBound games

The symbol ω (lower case letter) 

The minuscule letter ω is used as a symbol:
 Biology, biochemistry and chemistry:
 In biochemistry, for one of the RNA polymerase subunits
 In biochemistry, for the dihedral angle associated with the peptide group, involving the backbone atoms Cα-C'-N-Cα
 In biology, for fitness
 In chemistry, for denoting the carbon atom furthest from the carboxyl group of a fatty acid
 In genomics, as a measure of molecular evolution in protein-coding genes (also denoted as dN/dS or Ka/Ks ratio)
 Physics
Angular velocity or angular frequency
 In computational fluid dynamics, the specific turbulence dissipation rate
 In meteorology, the change of pressure with respect to time of a parcel of air
 In circuit analysis and signal processing to represent natural frequency, related to frequency f by ω = 2πf
 In astronomy, as a ranking of a star's brightness within a constellation
 In orbital mechanics, as designation of the argument of periapsis of an orbit
 In particle physics to represent the omega meson
 Computer science:
 In notation related to Big O notation, the asymptotically dominant nature of functions
 In relational database theory to represent NULL, a missing or inapplicable value
 In APL, to represent the right parameter to a function
Mathematics:
 The first and smallest transfinite ordinal number, often identified with the set of natural numbers including 0 (sometimes written )
 In set theory, ω1 is the first uncountable ordinal number (also sometimes written as Ω)
 A primitive root of unity, like the complex cube roots of 1
 The Wright Omega function
 A generic differential form
 In number theory, ω(n) is the number of distinct prime divisors of n
 In number theory, an arithmetic function
 In combinatory logic, the self-application combinator, (λ x. x x)
 In mathematical/options finance, the elasticity of financial options
 In analytical investment management, the tracking error of an investment manager
 Clique number in Graph theory
 Other:
 Used in place of ん in Japanese typing shorthand.
 In linguistics, the phonological word
 In textual criticism, the archetype of a manuscript tradition
 In sociology, used to refer to the lowest ranking member of a group
 In shift_JIS art, used to represent the cat's mouth. (e.g. (´･ω･`) ｼｮﾎﾞｰﾝ)
 In actuarial sciences, used to represent the maximum life span that characterizes a mortality table

Character encodings

Greek omega/Coptic oou

Cyrillic omega

Latin/IPA omega

Technical omega symbols

Mathematical omega

These characters are used only as mathematical symbols. Stylized Greek text should be encoded using the normal Greek letters, with markup and formatting to indicate the style of the text.

Notes 

Greek letters
Vowel letters